Majerle is a Slovene surname.  Notable people with the surname include:

Dan Majerle (born 1965), American basketball player and coach
Martina Majerle (born 1980), Croatian singer

See also
Majere (disambiguation)

Slovene-language surnames